Koçyazı is a town within the Yunak district in Konya Province, Turkey.

History 
The district's former name is Çıpkanlı.

Geography 

Climate 
The climate of the locality is within the domain of the continental climate.

Population

Politics 
Kocyazi was managed by the municipality until 2015. After 2015, the Municipality of Kocyazi was left to the Neighborhood Representative of the municipalities with the Law No. 6360 of Metropolitan.

Economy 
The economy of the neighborhood is based on agriculture, animal husbandry, and trade.

Service department 
In the neighborhood, there are primary and secondary schools. PTT branch. PTT agency, Family Health Center, Reeve Department, and Fire Department. Its infrastructure includes a drinking water network and sewerage.

References

External links 

https://www.yerelnet.org.tr/belediyeler/belediye_secimsonuclari.php?yil=1994&belediyeid=127781
http://www.yerelnet.org.tr/belediyeler/index.php?belediyeid=127781

Populated places in Konya Province